Aşağı Xuc (also, Aşaqı Xuç, Ashaga Khuch, Ashagy-Guch, and Ashagy-Khuch) is a village and municipality in the Quba Rayon of Azerbaijan.  It has a population of 904.  The municipality consists of the villages of Aşagı Xuç and Orta Xuç.

References

External links

Populated places in Quba District (Azerbaijan)